Diana Pilli David (born 2 March 1985 in Chirala, Andhra Pradesh) is a cricketer who represents India. She is a right hand batswoman and bowls right-arm off-breaks. She has played six ODIs, taking eight wickets.

Early life 
She was born in Chirala, Andhra Pradesh.

Career 
She made her ODI debut against the West Indies in 2004.

References

Living people
1985 births
People from Prakasam district
India women One Day International cricketers
India women Twenty20 International cricketers
Cricketers from Andhra Pradesh
Sportswomen from Andhra Pradesh
Hyderabad women cricketers